"Look After You" is a song by American rock band the Fray.  It was released in February 2007 as the third single from their debut album, How to Save a Life, following the widespread success of their previous single "How to Save a Life". According to lead singer and pianist Isaac Slade, the song was written about his then-girlfriend and future wife, Anna, when she was living in Australia. The song has appeared on the TV show Intervention for its third season and has been featured in episodes of Cold Case, Ghost Whisperer, The Hills, One Tree Hill, Journeyman, Moonlight, Rescue Me, Bones and the unaired pilot of Women's Murder Club. It was also featured in the 2008 film Jumper.

Chart performance
Expected to be a big hit, the song only peaked at #59 on the Billboard Hot 100, becoming the band's first single to miss the Top 40. The song also missed the Top 40 on the Billboard's Pop 100, although it performed marginally better on the chart than on the Billboard Hot 100, peaking at #49.

Live
When the band performs the song live, they sometimes insert a small interlude after the chorus where Slade sings the refrains from either "Wonderwall" by Oasis, "You Are So Beautiful" by Joe Cocker or "You're Beautiful" by James Blunt.

Music video 
A music video for the song reported in progress in February 2007, with Chris Mills as the director. However, the video was never released.

Charts

Weekly charts

Year-end charts

References

External links
 The Fray's homepage—official website.

2005 songs
2007 singles
The Fray songs
Rock ballads
Songs written by Joe King (guitarist)
Songs written by Isaac Slade
Epic Records singles